Eristena lunaris is a moth in the family Crambidae. It was described by Ping You, Hou-Hun Li and Shu-Xia Wang in 2003. It is found in China (Guangxi).

References

Acentropinae
Moths described in 2003